St. Anthony of Padua Roman Catholic Church is a Roman Catholic church in Wilmington, Delaware. Named in honor of Anthony of Padua, it falls within the jurisdiction of the Roman Catholic Diocese of Wilmington and is operated by the Oblates of St. Francis de Sales. It is situated in Wilmington's Little Italy neighborhood, where the parish includes St. Anthony's School (adjacent to the church) and Padua Academy.

Every June, the church runs an Italian Festival, a week-long event which celebrates the Feast of Saint Anthony.  This festival features four outdoor cafes, each with their own live entertainment, and unique food selections.  The Festival is the second-largest of its kind in the United States. Admission fees were established for the first time in 2008.

The Romanesque revival architectural style owes its inspiration to the Basilica di San Zeno in Verona, Italy.  Italian immigrants who settled in the area took seven years to construct the building.  Construction was led by Ernesto DiSabatino who later founded EDiS Company and received the Papal Cross of Honor Pro Ecclesia et Pontifice for his efforts for the construction of the church.

The church was listed on the National Register of Historic Places in 1984.

Gallery

See also
 National Register of Historic Places listings in Wilmington, Delaware

References

External links
 St. Anthony's Church
 NRHP Site Listing with Photos
 St. Anthony's Italian Festival web site

Roman Catholic churches in Wilmington, Delaware
Churches on the National Register of Historic Places in Delaware
Italian-American history
Italian-American culture in Delaware
Romanesque Revival church buildings in Delaware
National Register of Historic Places in Wilmington, Delaware